Andy Taylor, co-manager of the British band Iron Maiden and co-founder in 1979 of Sanctuary Records, which described itself, as of January 2007, as the UK's largest independent record company, one of the world's leading developers of music intellectual property rights (IPR) and the world's largest independent owner of music IPR. The company was named after the Iron Maiden song "Sanctuary". His business partner is Rod Smallwood, whom he met when students at Trinity College, Cambridge.

References

External links

"My Time at Cambridge", interview and profile of Andy Taylor, Cambridge Alumni Magazine, 2005

Iron Maiden (band)
Year of birth missing (living people)
Living people
Alumni of Trinity College, Cambridge
Place of birth missing (living people)